Shamsun Nahar, also known as Shamsun Nahar Sr. (born 31 January 2003) is a Bangladeshi women's association football defender who plays as a left-back for Bashundhara Kings Women and the Bangladesh women's national football team. She previously played for the Bangladesh women's national under-17 football team and was twice a member of the winning Bangladesh team in the AFC U-14 Girls' Regional Championship – South and Central, held in Nepal in 2015 and in Tajikistan in 2016.  She currently plays football at the Kolsindur High School in Mymensingh as a defender, most recently in the 2017 AFC U-16 Women's Championship.

Early years
Shamsunnahar was born on 31 January 2003 in  Kolsindur, Dhobaura, Mymensingh district.

Playing career
Shamsunnahar first played in 2011 Bangamata Sheikh Fazilatunnesa Mujib Gold Cup Football Tournament for Kalsindur Government Primary School.

International
Shamsunnahar was selected to the Bangladesh women's national under-17 football team for the 2017 AFC U-16 Women's Championship qualification – Group C matches. She played first time at the tournament in the match against Iran on 27 August 2016.

Honours

Club 
Bashundhara Kings Women

 Bangladesh Women's Football League
 Winners (2): 2019–20, 2020–21

International 
SAFF Women's Championship
Winner : 2022
Runner-up : 2016
South Asian Games
Bronze : 2016
SAFF U-18 Women's Championship
Champion (2): 2018, 2021
Bangamata U-19 Women's International Gold Cup
Champion trophy shared (1): 2019
 AFC U-14 Girls' Regional Championship – South and Central
 Bangladesh U-14 Girls'
 Champion (2): 2015, 2016

References

External links

2003 births
Living people
Bangladeshi women's footballers
Bangladesh women's international footballers
Bashundhara Kings players
Bangladesh Women's Football League players
Women's association football defenders
People from Mymensingh District
Bangladeshi women's futsal players
Kalsindur Government Primary School alumni
South Asian Games bronze medalists for Bangladesh
South Asian Games medalists in football